Kuorasjärvi is medium-sized lake in the Lapuanjoki main catchment area. It is located in the region Southern Ostrobothnia, in the municipality of Alavus, Finland.

See also
List of lakes in Finland

References

Lakes of Alavus